David Andrew Evans (born 25 November 1975) is a Welsh manager and former professional footballer who is currently manager of Penparcau

A trainee with Cardiff City, where he won a Welsh Under-21 cap, before drifting through Merthyr Tydfil and Ebbw Vale to Aberystwyth and a job as a postman. At Park Avenue he immediately attracted the interest of First Division Barnsley and a £15,000 transfer fee. But, after just two appearances, he was loaned out to Mansfield Town and Chester City before being allowed to join Stalybridge Celtic, then on to Frickley Athletic, Belper Town and Ossett Town. He rejoined the Seasiders in summer 2006 from Frickley

In 2010 he joined Porthmadog.

References 

1975 births
Living people
Footballers from Aberystwyth
Welsh footballers
Wales under-21 international footballers
Cardiff City F.C. players
Merthyr Tydfil F.C. players
Aberystwyth Town F.C. players
Barnsley F.C. players
Mansfield Town F.C. players
Chester City F.C. players
Ilkeston Town F.C. (1945) players
Frickley Athletic F.C. players
Stalybridge Celtic F.C. players
Carmarthen Town A.F.C. players
Cymru Premier players
English Football League players
National League (English football) players
Association football forwards
Porthmadog F.C. players
Penparcau F.C. managers